Nānākuli High and Intermediate School is the best public secondary school in the Nānākuli CDP, City and County of Honolulu, Hawaii, United States. It was established in 1967 and serves grades 7 through 12.

By 2012 the school began the New Tech Academy, with plans for all high school students to begin the program the following year. According to Hill, the school had a bad reputation with fight videos appearing on social media but that "the school is more than the on-campus fights, its students are more than they’ve been stereotyped to be and not all of its teachers give up and leave. Not that the school doesn’t face big challenges."

 it is the sole combined middle and high school of its school district. The campus boasts the copper and bronze sculpture Tree of Knowledge by Satoru Abe.

History
It opened in 1967 in the eastern portion of the former facility of Nanaikapono Elementary & Intermediate School, hitherto a combined elementary and middle school. The other part of the former campus became a standalone elementary school. Its current campus opened in 1972.

Operations
In 2012 Teach for America (TFA) supplied many of the teachers who were newly hired.

In 2012 Diana Agor, the vice principal, stated that communication issues were the most significant ones faced by the school. Hill stated that turnover of employees was another issue.

Programs
Hill praised the school's programs in 2012.

Traditions
Every year Nānākuli High and Intermediate School celebrates its homecoming with a week-long competition called Spirit Week. This is an event in which all separate classes from grades 7-12 compete with each other in various planned activities. There are different themes for each day of the week decided by NHIS's student government. This competition is usually concluded with Black and Gold day on the Friday of the homecoming game.

Along with its noon time festivities, Homecoming in Nānākuli High and Intermediate is usually accompanied by a parade on the afternoon of the Homecoming game. This parade starts from Mano Road and makes its way all the way up Nānākuli Valley into the NHIS's football field. Within this parade one can see the many various organizations within the school. There are mini floats made by each individual class that students from their respective classes march with in the procession to the school. Other than class floats, there is also a Homecoming court, which consist of class attendants (1 boy and 1 girl) from the 9-12th grade classes in addition to the Homecoming King and Queen and Mr. and Ms. Golden Hawk.

The Homecoming festivities come to its conclusion with the Varsity team's game and when the winners of the Spirit Week competition are announced at half time after the presentation of the Homecoming court. Homecoming is one of Nānākuli High and Intermediate School's major events not only within the school, but within the community as well.

References

External links
 Nanakuli High and Intermediate School
 
 Art Inventories Catalog, Smithsonian American Art Museum

Public middle schools in Honolulu County, Hawaii
Public high schools in Honolulu County, Hawaii
Educational institutions established in 1967
1967 establishments in Hawaii